Léon Close (20 August 1931 – 24 February 2015) was a Belgian footballer. He played in two matches for the Belgium national football team from 1957 to 1958.

References

External links
 
 

1931 births
2015 deaths
Belgian footballers
Belgium international footballers
Place of birth missing
Association football defenders
Royale Union Saint-Gilloise players
Léopold FC players